IB Sat  is a Balearic television channel operated by Televisió de les Illes Balears.

External links
Official Website

Catalan-language television stations
Television stations in the Balearic Islands
Television stations in Spain

ca:Televisió de les Illes Balears